Eou yadam ("Eou's Unofficial Histories") is a collection of stories by Yu Mong-in (유몽인, 1559–1623), a scholar, official and writer of the Joseon Dynasty of Korea (1392-1910). The title is composed of his pen name, "Eou", and "yadam",  which can be roughly translated as "unofficial histories" or "miscellaneous talks" in English. Eou yadam was written in classical Chinese, the written lingua franca of the time. It remains five volumes in one book although Eou yadam originally consisted of 10 volumes. It is regarded the progenitor of yadam, a body of collected stories that flourished in the late Joseon period. While some of his contemporaries praised Eou Yadam as written in a lucid, and succinct literary style, Eu Yadam was never published until the late 19th century because of  Yu Mong-in's unfortunate political career, which bought the capital punishment for him and his son for the rumour that they plotted against the then-reigning King Injo. Eu yadam is cited in a number of Joseon literary works by scholars such as Jang Yu (1587–1638), Yi Ik (1681–1763), Jong Yak-yong (1762–1836), etc. At least thirty different editions of Eou yadam are extant. These were used by Yu Mong-in's descendants to reconstruct Eou yadam. This version is called the Manjong-jae version. A number of manuscripts are found at libraries such as National Library of Korea and Kyujanggak, Seoul, South Korea.

Derivative work 

 Legend of the Blue Sea

See also
History of Korea
Korean literature

References

External links
 『어우야담』에 나타난 상대적 사유와 언어 표현 at DBPIA

History books about Korea
Joseon dynasty works